Zeno Robinson is an American voice actor and comedian. He has done voice acting for both Western animation and English-language dubs of Japanese anime. Some of his major anime roles include: Hawks in My Hero Academia (for which he won Best VA Performance (EN) at the 2021 Anime Awards); Goh in the Pokémon anime; Vanitas in The Case Study of Vanitas; Zenon Zogratis in Black Clover; Garfiel Tinsel in Re:Zero; Genya Shinazugawa in Demon Slayer: Kimetsu no Yaiba; and Brawler in Akudama Drive. His major animation roles include: Remy Remington in Disney's Big City Greens; Cyborg/Victor Stone in Young Justice; Alan Albright in Ben 10: Alien Force and Ben 10: Ultimate Alien; Young King Andrias in Amphibia; and Hunter in The Owl House.

Filmography

Anime

Animation

Video games

Film

Awards and nominations

References

External links
 
 

Living people
African-American male actors
American male video game actors
American male voice actors
Crunchyroll Anime Awards winners
1993 births
21st-century African-American people
21st-century American male actors